Verónica Llinás (born September 23, 1960) is an Argentine film, television and theatre actress. She is the daughter of the writer Julio Llinás and the painter Martha Peluffo and sister of Sebastián Llinás and the film director Mariano Llinás.

Career 
She trained with Agustín Alezzo, Ángel Elizondo and Miguel Guerberoff. She was a member of the mythical theater group Gambas al Ajillo, which from 1986 to 1990, presented different shows at the Parakultural Center, the Empire Theater and the Cement nightclub.

Partial filmography 
 Deathstalker (1983)
 The Plague (1992)
 I Don't Want to Talk About It (1993)
 Rapado (1996)
 Todas las azafatas van al cielo (2002)
 Glue (2006)
 Viudas e hijos del Rock & Roll (2014-2015)
 La mujer de los perros (2015) (star, co-writer, co-director)
 Psiconautas (2016)
 Educando a Nina (2016)
 La flor (2018)

References 

Argentine film directors
Argentine film actresses
Argentine theatre people
Argentine male television actors
1960 births
Living people